U.S. states, districts, and territories have representative symbols that are recognized by their state legislatures, territorial legislatures, or tradition.  Some, such as flags, seals, and birds have been created or chosen by all U.S. polities, while others, such as state crustaceans, state mushrooms, and state toys have been chosen by only a few.

Lists by symbol

Insignia
Insignia
Coats of arms
Colors
Flags
Governor standards
Mottos
Nicknames
Seals
Governor seals

Flora and fauna
Amphibians
Bats
Birds
Crustaceans
Dinosaurs
Dog breeds
Fish
Flowers
Grasses
Horse breeds
Insects
Mammals
Microbes
Mushrooms
Plants
Reptiles
Seashells
Trees

Geology
Fossils
Minerals, rocks, stones, and gemstones
Soils

Other
Commemorative quarter-dollar coins
Dances
Firearms
Foods
Beverages
 License plates
Musical instruments
Poems
Route markers
Ships
Songs
Sports
Tartans
Toys

Lists by state, territory, and district

 Alabama
 Alaska
 American Samoa
 Arizona
 Arkansas
 California
 Colorado
 Connecticut
 Delaware
 District of Columbia
 Florida
 Georgia
 Guam
 Hawaii
 Idaho
 Illinois
 Indiana
 Iowa
 Kansas
 Kentucky
 Louisiana
 Maine
 Maryland
 Massachusetts
 Michigan
 Minnesota
 Mississippi
 Missouri
 Montana
 Nebraska
 Nevada
 New Hampshire
 New Jersey
 New Mexico
 New York
 North Carolina
 North Dakota
 Northern Mariana Islands
 Ohio
 Oklahoma
 Oregon
 Pennsylvania
 Puerto Rico
 Rhode Island
 South Carolina
 South Dakota
 Tennessee
 Texas
 U.S. Virgin Islands
 Utah
 Vermont
 Virginia
 Washington
 West Virginia
 Wisconsin
 Wyoming

See also
 National symbol
 National symbols of the United States
 List of Canadian provincial and territorial symbols